St Michael's Hamlet, also known as St Michael-in-the-Hamlet or simply St Michael's, is a suburb of Liverpool, Merseyside, England and a Liverpool City Council Ward. It is located to the south of the city, bordered by Dingle, Aigburth and Mossley Hill.

History
During the Victorian era, St Michael's was a very wealthy parish, reflecting the wealth of the city of Liverpool. Its parish church, St Michael's, is of a cast-iron construction by John Cragg, who was also responsible for St George's and St Philip's churches in the city.

Description
It is a residential area to the west of Aigburth Road, near Sefton Park. Housing is a mix of semi-detached and terraced houses, with a few detached developments near the waterfront. St Michaels is part of Aigburth, an adjacent suburb which is larger. St Michael's Hamlet was designated a conservation area on 12 December 1968.

Government

The elected councillors for St. Michael's are Cllr Sarah Jennings, Cllr Tom Crone and Cllr Anna Key (Green Party). The area is in the Liverpool, Riverside Parliamentary constituency.

Transport
The area is served by St Michaels railway station on Merseyrail's Northern Line. Regular trains depart for Liverpool city centre, Southport and Hunts Cross. Regular buses run along Aigburth Road from Liverpool city centre, including services to Liverpool John Lennon Airport.

References

External links

 Liverpool Street Gallery - Liverpool 17

Saint Michael's Hamlet